Beipiaosaurus  is a genus of therizinosauroid theropod dinosaurs that lived in Asia during the Early Cretaceous in the Yixian Formation. The first remains were found in 1996 and formally described in 1999. Before the discovery of Yutyrannus, they were among the heaviest dinosaurs known from direct evidence to be feathered. Beipiaosaurus is known from three reported specimens preserving numerous impressions of feather structures that allowed to determine the feathering color which turned out to be brownish.

The necks of Beipiaosaurus were shorter than in most therizinosaurs, whose are characterized by elongated necks adapted for high-browsing. Also, their feet configuration differs from therizinosaurids, having a generic three-toed pes instead of four as seen in other members.

The exact classification of therizinosaurs had in the past been hotly debated, since their prosauropod-like teeth and body structure indicate that they were generally herbivorous, unlike typical theropods. Beipiaosaurus, being considered to be a primitive therizinosauroid, has features which suggest that all therizinosauroids, including the more derived Therizinosauridae, to be coelurosaurian theropods, not sauropodomorph or ornithischian relatives as once believed.

History of discovery
In 1996, the peasant Li Yinxian discovered a partial skeleton of a theropod dinosaur near the village of Sihetun. On the following year it was confirmed to have come from the lower beds of the Yixian Formation and represent a single individual. On May 27, 1999, the discovery was announced on the famous journal Nature and the type species Beipiaosaurus inexpectus named and described by Xu Xing, Tang Zhilu and Wang Xiaolin. The generic name Beipiaosaurus translates as "Beipiao lizard" after Beipiao, a city in China near the location of its discovery. Beipiaosaurus is known from a single species, B. inexpectus, the specific name, meaning "unexpected" in Latin, referring to the "surprising features in these animals".

The holotype (type specimen) of Beipiaosaurus inexpectus, IVPP V11559, was recovered in the Jianshangou Beds of the Yixian Formation in Liaoning Province, China. The specimen was collected in sediment deposited during the Aptian stage of the Early Cretaceous period, approximately 125 million years ago. It is housed in the collection of the Institute of Vertebrate Paleontology and Paleoanthropology, in Beijing, China. It consists of a partial, sub-adult, skeleton that is largely disarticulated.  A significant number of fossilized bones were recovered, including: cranial fragments, a mandible, teeth, three cervical vertebrae, four dorsal vertebrae, four dorsal ribs, two sacral vertebrae, twenty-five caudal vertebrae with a pygostyle, three chevrons, an incomplete furcula and scapula, both coracoids, both forelimbs, both ilia, an incomplete pubis, an incomplete ischium, a femur, both tibiae (one incomplete), an incomplete fibula, the astragalus and calcaneum, several tarsals, metatarsals, manual and pedal unguals, and skin impressions of the primitive plumage. The pelvic girdle and caudal vertebrae were discovered during a re-excavation of the fossil quarry where the first elements of the holotype were found. These rediscovered elements helped to complete the holotype specimen.

A second specimen, STM 31-1, a partial skeleton, was described by Xu et al. 2009, which preserves a significant covering of unique, elongated feathers. This specimen consisted of a complete skull, a sclerotic ring, the mandible, the atlas and axis bones, nine additional cervical vertebrae, dorsal vertebrae, seventeen cervical ribs, twelve dorsal ribs, both scapulae and coracoids, one complete humerus and proximal humerus, one complete radius and distal radius, one complete ulna and distal ulna, carpals, and some metacarpals. The rear of the skull of this specimen was badly crushed. Li et al. 2014 mentioned a third specimen labelled under the number BMNHC PH000911. This specimen hails from the Sihetun locality at the Beipiao County in Liaoning Province and compromises a partial individual preserving the skull (badly crushed), most of the vertebral column, both arms and other postcrania. Traces of feather integument were extensively found around the neck area.

Description

It is estimated to have weighed about  based on femur length. More advanced therizinosaurids have four functional toes, but the feet of Beipiaosaurus still have reduced inner toes, showing that the derived therizinosaurid condition may have evolved from a three-toed therizinosauroid ancestor. The head was large relative to other therizinosaurs, with the lower jaw measuring about same length as the femur. The neck appears to be shorter compared to other therizinosaurs. In 2003 the pygostyle, consisting of the fused five last vertebrae of the tail, was described in greater detail, suggesting that the original function of the pygostyle was not linked with pennaceous feathers.

Distinguishing traits
According to Zanno in 2010, Beipiaosaurus can be distinguished from other therizinosaur taxa based on the following characteristics, which are unique derived traits (autapomorphies): a low ridge is present on the front of the thighbone shaft which extends upwards from the inner condyle; the last four dorsal vertebrae are fused; from at least the seventh vertebra onwards the tail vertebrae are fused into a pygostyle; a prominent triangular flange extends outwards, away from the body, from the underside of the first metacarpal; the skull is large, about as long as the thighbone; the first phalanx of the first digit has a joint surface with the claw, that is elongated in the direction of the finger tip on the outer side of its lower part; on the front edge of the ischium a projection, the obturator process, has a wavy profile with a tip that is curved downwards; the "boot" at the lower end of the ischium has twice the width, measured from the front to the rear, of the lower shaft of the ischium.

In 2019 Liao and Xu redescribed the holotype skull in detail, noting new unique cranial traits for Beipiaosaurus. These consisted of the large postorbital joint of the frontal and its abrupt transition from the orbital edge, a long and keen anterior joint of the parietal, an elongate bottom branching of the squamosal articulation of the parietal, and the deeply external mandibular fenestra that is located towards the rear.

Feathers and color

The first feather impressions were found in the holotype specimen, consisting of short, slender filamentous feathers on the left arm. These impressions indicated that the body was predominately covered by downy feather-like fibers, similar to those of Sinosauropteryx, but longer, and oriented perpendicular to the arm. Xu et al. 1999 suggested that these downy feathers represent an intermediate stage between Sinosauropteryx and more advanced birds (Avialae).

Unique among known theropods, Beipiaosaurus also possessed a secondary coat of much longer, simpler feathers that rose out of the down layer. These unique feathers known as EBFFs (elongated broad filamentous feathers) were first described by Xu et al. 2009, based on specimen STM 31-1 consisting of the torso, head and neck. Xu and his team also found EBFFs in the tail of the holotype IVPP V11559, which were revealed by further preparation. Some of these were damaged during preparation though.

The EBFFs differ from other feather types in that they consist of a single, unbranched filament. Most other primitive feathered dinosaurs have down-like feathers made up of two or more filaments branching out from a common base or along a central shaft. In Sinosauropteryx, the longest feathers are only about 15% of the neck length. Additionally, where most primitive feather types are circular in cross section, EBFFs appear to be oval-shaped. None of the preserved EBFFs were curved or bent beyond a broad arc in either specimen, indicating that they were fairly stiff. They were probably hollow, at least at the base.

In 2009 during an interview at Live Science, Xu stated: "Both are definitely not for flight, inferring the function of some structures of extinct animals would be very difficult, and in this case, we are not quite sure whether these feathers are for display or some other functions." He speculated that the finer feathers served as an insulatory coat and that the larger feathers were ornamental, perhaps for social interactions such as mating or communication.

Li et al. 2014 compared the color and shape of the melanosomes in 181 extant animal specimens, 13 fossil specimens (including Beipiaosaurus) and previous data about the melanosome diversity using scanning electron microscopes. They found that color in dinosaurs seem to be slightly connected with their physiology. While some species of living reptiles (lizards or crocodiles, which are ectothermic) have less diversity in the shape of melanosomes and darker color ranges, some maniraptorans, birds and mammals (which are endothermic) have an increased diversity of melanosome shapes and more vivid colors. The examined specimen of Beipaosaurus, BMNHC PH000911, preserves feather impressions which are located in the neck area. These are filamentous/sparse in structure and the sampled melanosomes were sphere-shaped and inferred to had a brownish colouration like those in modern reptiles which fall within the range of dark brownish colourations.

Jianchangosaurus is another primitive therizinosaur taxon known from the same formation that was found with impressions of a series of filamentous and unbranched feathers in its holotype specimen. Only the distal ends of the feather impressions are visible and based on their morphology the feathers are considered to be EBFFs, bearing resemblance to those found along the specimens of Beipiaosaurus. These findings suggest that they might have been used for visual display and were common among early therizinosaurs.

An evo-devo study published in the year 2003 defined what is a feather. It's stated that the integumentary structures of Beipiaosaurus weren't true feathers, those integumentary structures are filaments that are related to feathers.

Classification

The affinities of therizinosaurs were originally obscure and often problematic, giving rise to taxonomic debate since they feature similar adaptations to the unrelated sauropodomorphs and ornithischians. The description of Beipiaosaurus helped to assemble the definitive placement of therizinosaurs within the Theropoda, especially as maniraptorans thanks to the numerous theropod features and irrefutable feather impressions in the holotype.

Beipiaosaurus was first assigned to the Therizinosauroidea, in a very primitive position by  Xu et al. 1999. All subsequent phylogenetic analyses have confirmed this assignment. According to the definition by Paul Sereno of this group, Beipiaosaurus is even by definition the basal most member.  Lindsay E. Zanno noted that Beipiaosaurus shares a sister-taxon relationship with Falcarius, a taxon that includes all the more derived therizinosauroids, however, it appears to be that Falcarius is more primitive than Beipiaosaurus.

The cladogram below is the result of the performed phylogenetic analysis of the Therizinosauria by Hartman et al. 2019 which is largely based on the data provided by the revision of Zanno in 2010. Beipiaosaurus occupied a more derived position than Falcarius, as previously indicated by Zanno:

Paleobiology

In 2018, McNamara and colleagues discovered the fossilised remains of skin flakes from numerous feathered dinosaurs from the Jehol Biota and some bird species using scanning electron microscope on the preserved feather impressions. The analyzed fossil taxa consisted of  Confuciusornis, Beipiaosaurus, Microraptor and Sinornithosaurus. For Beipiaosaurus, the specimen STM 31-1 was analyzed.

By exposing the skin flakes under an electron microscope they found corneocytes, which are cells rich in keratin. In order to make comparisons with extant feathered dinosaurs, they analyzed several bird taxa such as Anas, Lonchura and Taeniopygia and found similar cell structures, but the fossil dinosaur corneocytes were more densely packed with keratin and lacking lipids (fat), suggesting that Beipiaosaurus and co-analyzed taxa did not get as warm as modern birds, mainly because they were ground-dwelling animals not able to fly. In the case of the primitive birds Confuciusornis, they could not fly at all for long periods. In modern birds these structures, with the addition of fats, help to regulate body temperature during active flight.

In addition, the identified corneocytes structures seem to indicate that non-avian dinosaurs had a similar way of shedding skin to extant birds and mammals. Unlike many reptiles alive today (lizards or snakes) which shed their skin as a single piece or as several large pieces, Beipiaosaurus and other non-avian dinosaurs shed their skin as dandruff, like Confuciusornis, modern birds or mammals.

Paleoecology
Studies suggest that the paleoenvironment of the Yixian Formation involved seasonal climate fluctuations, and was warm and humid, punctuated by dry seasons, in which the environment became more arid. A study by Wu et al. 2013 concluded that orbital forcing, which is the effect on climate caused by shifts in the tilt of the Earth's axis and by the shape of the Earth's orbit, contributed to the climate fluctuations of this formation.

The Yixian Formation is well known for its great diversity of well-preserved specimens and its dinosaurs, such as the tyrannosauroids Dilong and Yutyrannus, the dromaeosaurids Sinornithosaurus, oviraptorosaurs including Caudipteryx, compsognathids including Sinocalliopteryx, avialans including Confuciusornis and some non-theropod dinosaurs, such as Psittacosaurus and Dongbeititan.

Other contemporaries of Beipiaosaurus included ancient shrimp, snails and slugs, as well as a diverse group of insects, and fish such as Lycoptera. Most vertebrates in this formation showed a tendency to become arboreal, including many tree-dwelling birds, and climbing mammals and lizards. The flora was dominated by conifers related to modern species that are found mainly in subtropical and temperate upland forests, with the presence of ferns, cycads, and horsetails.

See also

 Timeline of therizinosaur research
Falcarius

References

External links
 Dinosauria - News of the first Beipiaosaurus discovery.
 Skeletal restoration
 Therizinosauroidea - UCMP, Berkeley
 Detailed skull of STM 31-1 at Sketchfab

Early Cretaceous dinosaurs of Asia
Yixian fauna
Feathered dinosaurs
Fossil taxa described in 1999
Therizinosaurs
Taxa named by Xu Xing